De Kleilânsmole was a smock mill which formerly stood in Marrum, Friesland, Netherlands and which was built in 1865 and dismantled in 2010. The mill had been restored as a landmark. The mill was listed as a Rijksmonument, number 15597.

History

De Kleilânsmole was built in 1865 to drain the  De Traan polder. Until 1947, there were two Archimedes' screw, enabling the mill to drain and fill its polder. These were replaced by an electrically driven pump. The mill was restored in 1974 and on 4 May 1976, the mill was sold to Stichting De Fryske Mole. It is planned to move De Kleilânsmole to Ferwerd to replace De Non, which burnt down in 1990. At Ferwerd, the mill will be restored to full working order.  In 2010, the mill was dismantled by Bouwbedrijf Kolthof, Marrum and is currently at the millwright's workshop where it is being restored.

Description

Kleilânsmole was what the Dutch describe as a Grondzeiler. It was a two-storey smock mill on a single-storey base. There was no stage, the sails reaching almost to ground level. The mill was winded by tailpole and winch. The smock and cap were thatched. The sails were Common sails. The sails were carried on a cast-iron windshaft. which was cast by H J Koning, Foxham, Groningen in 1908. The mill was latterly devoid of machinery. The Archimedes' screw formerly fitted to the mill lifted  of water per revolution.

References

Windmills in Friesland
Windmills completed in 1865
Smock mills in the Netherlands
Windpumps in the Netherlands
Former Rijksmonuments in Friesland
Octagonal buildings in the Netherlands